Alfred George Black (15 March 1902–1972) was an English footballer who played in the Football League for Luton Town and Millwall.

References

1902 births
1972 deaths
English footballers
Association football forwards
English Football League players
Sittingbourne F.C. players
Millwall F.C. players
Luton Town F.C. players
Folkestone F.C. players